11 Episodios Sinfónicos (11 Symphonic Episodes) is a live album recorded by Gustavo Cerati at the Teatro Avenida of Buenos Aires in August 2001. Following the footsteps of other important artists, Cerati rearranged eleven tracks from both his former band Soda Stereo and his solo albums into symphonic melodies. The concert consisted of him singing while the orchestra played along while being directed by Alejandro Terán. A DVD was also released which featured four additional songs not included in the CD, as well as behind-the-scenes extras and a documentary.

Reception
The Allmusic review by Drago Bonacich awarded the album 4 stars stating "The album brings a collection of greatest hits with well-crafted arrangements and sophisticated sounds, mostly delivered by violins and violoncellos. In addition, Cerati's seductive voice allows listeners to establish a captivating connection between rock en español and classical music.".

CD Track Listing
 "Canción Animal" (Animal Song) – 5:32 (originally from Canción Animal, 1990)
 "Bocanada" (Mouthful) – 4:01 (originally from Bocanada, 1999)
 "Corazón Delator" (Tell-Tale Heart) – 6:22 (originally from Doble Vida, 1988)
 "El Rito" (The Rite) – 6:51 (originally from Signos, 1986)
 "A Merced" (At Mercy) – 2:33 (originally from Amor Amarillo, 1993)
 "Raiz" (Root) – 4:12 (originally from Bocanada, 1999)
 "Sweet Sahumerio" – 6:40 (originally from Dynamo, 1992)
 "Persiana Americana" (American Blinds) – 6:52 (originally from Signos, 1986)
 "Verbo Carne" (Flesh Verb) – 3:55 (originally from Bocanada, 1999)
 "Un Millón de Años Luz" (A Million Light Years) – 5:19 (originally from Canción Animal, 1990)
 "Signos" (Signs) – 5:36 (originally from Signos, 1986)

Bonus Tracks on DVD
"Pasos" (Demo) (originally from Sueño Stereo, 1995)
"Fue" (originally from Dynamo, 1992)
"Lisa" (originally from Amor Amarillo, 1993)
"Hombre al Agua" (originally from Canción Animal, 1990)

Personnel 

 Gustavo Cerati – Composer, Vocals
 Andrés Bercellini, Louis Martino, Richard Nant, Miguel Tallarita – Trumpet
 Dimitri Rodnoi, Diego Sánchez – Cello
 Kristina Bara, Elizabeth Ridolfi, Jorge Sandrini – Viola
 Pablo Aznarez, José Bagnatti, Damián Bolotín, Javier Casalla, María Mercedes Molina, Sebastián Prusak – Violin

Technical personnel 

 Guillermo Andino – Executive Producer
 Eloisa Ballivián – Graphic Design
 Eduardo Bergallo – Engineer, Mixing
 Diego Blanco – Digital Editing
 Carmelo Domínguez – Executive Producer
 Alejandro Franov – Librettist
 Daniel Melero – Composer
 Gonzalo Rainoldi – Mixing Assistant
 Pablo Ramírez – Wardrobe
 Marcelo Rios – Wardrobe
 Mariano Rodriguez – Recording Assistant
 Diego Sáenz – Producer
 Sebastian Schachtel – Theremin
 Urko Suaya – Graphic Design
 Alejandro Terán – Arranger, Direction

Charts

References

2001 live albums
2001 video albums
Gustavo Cerati video albums
Live video albums
Spanish-language live albums
Spanish-language video albums
Gustavo Cerati live albums
Bertelsmann Music Group video albums
Bertelsmann Music Group live albums
Live albums recorded in Buenos Aires